Barranco Minas is a town and municipality located in the Guainía Department, Republic of Colombia. It has the Barranco Minas Airport.

References

Municipalities of Guainía Department